is a passenger railway station on the Minato Line in the city of Hitachinaka, Ibaraki, Japan, operated by the third-sector railway operator Hitachinaka Seaside Railway.

Lines

Station layout
The station is unstaffed and consists of a single island platform serving two tracks. The station building is located directly on the platform.

Platforms

History
Kaneage Station opened on 17 July 1928 as a station on the Minato Railway.

Passenger statistics
In fiscal 2011, the station was used by an average of 90 passengers daily.

Surrounding area
JGSDF Camp Katsuta
JGSDF Engineer School

See also
 List of railway stations in Japan

References

External links

 Hitachinaka Seaside Railway station information 

Railway stations in Ibaraki Prefecture
Railway stations in Japan opened in 1928
Hitachinaka, Ibaraki